King's Highway403 (pronounced "four-oh-three"), or simply Highway403, is a 400-series highway in the Canadian province of Ontario that travels between Woodstock and Mississauga, branching off from and reuniting with Highway 401 at both ends and travelling south of it through Hamilton (where it is also known as the Chedoke Expressway) and Mississauga. The Highway403 designation was first applied in 1963 to a short stub of freeway branching off the QEW, and the entire route was completed on August15, 1997, when the section from Brantford to the then-still independent Town of Ancaster was opened to traffic. The section of Highway403 between Woodstock and Burlington was formally dedicated as the Alexander Graham Bell Parkway on April27, 2016, in honour of Alexander Graham Bell.

The majority of Highway403 is surrounded by suburban land use, except west of Hamilton, where it passes through agricultural land; Brantford is the only urban area through this section. In Hamilton, Highway403 descends the Niagara Escarpment, then wraps around the northern side of Hamilton Harbour to encounter the QEW. From there, co-signed with the QEW, it travels straight through Burlington and Oakville, departing from the QEW to the north at the Mississauga–Oakville boundary. The freeway then crosses through the centre of Mississauga in an east–west direction, serving its city centre. Turning north, Highway403 splits up into a collector-express system, with the express lanes defaulting to Highway401 east of that interchange, while the collector lanes thereafter continues north as Highway 410 to Brampton.

Route description

Woodstock to Burlington 
Highway403 begins at a junction with Highway401 on the outskirts of Woodstock. The eastbound lanes split from eastbound Highway401, whereas the westbound lanes merge into westbound Highway401.
It travels along the back lot lines of the second concession south of former Highway2.
This first section of the highway is also the least travelled portion, with approximately 20,900vehicles using it on an average day in 2016.
The highway passes beneath Oxford County Road 55 (formerly Highway53) and curves southeast. After crossing into the third concession, it curves back to the east. The highway travels straight for several kilometres, meeting with the southern leg of Highway 24, which travels south to Simcoe.

The highway crosses the Grand River to the south of Paris, then passes over former Highway2 as it enters Brantford. As it passes through Brantford, the highway angles southeast and passes beneath the northern leg of Highway24 and then the Wayne Gretzky Parkway. The route exits the small city to the east and curves northeast shortly thereafter. It travels between Jerseyville Road and former Highway2 to Ancaster, jogging to avoid cutting through Dunmark Lake. As the freeway enters Ancaster, it once again crosses former Highway2 and dips through the southern side of the town.

East of Ancaster, the freeway passes through a short greenbelt, with Hamilton Golf and Country Club lying to the north. A divided segment of Highway 6 meets the freeway and continues concurrently with it through Hamilton; to the south, Highway6 travels to Hamilton International Airport, Caledonia, and Jarvis at Highway 3. Continuing east, Highway403 and Highway6 curve north into Hamilton and meet the Lincoln M. Alexander Parkway before abruptly turning to the east and descending the Niagara Escarpment. Scenic views of Hamilton, its harbour, port and Lower Princess Falls are along this steep descent. At the bottom of the escarpment the highway travels through a narrow, heavily developed corridor alongside former Highway 8. It passes beneath multiple bridges in a depressed trench, eventually curving north at a sharp corner and passing beneath more bridges.
The highway returns to ground level alongside the Chedoke Creek, a now-channelized river from which the freeway may take its name.

As the freeway continues north, it crosses an isthmus between Hamilton Harbour and Cootes Paradise alongside several roads which it has served to replace. It circles around the northern shore of Hamilton Harbour and returns to an eastward orientation. The concurrency with Highway6 ends at an interchange where Highway403 continues east and Highway6 departs north towards Guelph. The freeway continues straight for several kilometres, passing by the Burlington Transmission Station, until it approaches the Freeman Interchange where the opposing carriageways split apart to accommodate the left-hand exit/entry of the flyover ramps marking the western terminus of Highway 407, then it merges with Queen Elizabeth Way.

Burlington to Mississauga 

At the Ford Assembly Plant near the Halton–Peel regional boundary, Highway403 branches off from the QEW as it crosses Ford Drive (Halton Regional Road 13), with the eastbound lanes diving under the QEW and Upper Middle Road before reuniting with the westbound carriageway. After running north–south for  along the western edge of Mississauga, Highway403 meets with Highway 407 again at a combination interchange where the two freeways curve 90 degrees to avoid crossing each other. Approaching this junction Highway403 westbound traffic defaults onto Highway407 so motorists have to continue on Highway403 via a semi-directional flyover that arcs from the west to the south. This north–south segment of Highway403 was originally planned as a temporary routing to be bypassed by a new direct Oakville-Burlington link; but in 1995 this routing became permanently part of Highway403 when the proposed link instead became part of Highway407.

Highway407 continues to the north and west, while Highway403 turns east to follow alongside a hydro corridor through the centre of Mississauga. A portion of the Mississauga Transitway express bus service utilizes the freeway's right shoulders between Erin Mills Parkway and Mavis Road. Between Highway407 and Highway401, high-occupancy vehicle (HOV) lanes are present in the left shoulder lanes for vehicles with at least one passenger.
Sandwiched between residential subdivisions on both sides, the freeway soon thereafter crosses the Credit River. On the other side of the river, between the interchanges with Mavis Road and Hurontario Street (formerly Highway 10), Highway403 skirts to the north of downtown Mississauga, as well as the Square One Shopping Centre.

After a split with Eastgate Parkway, the freeway abruptly curves to the north. As the curve straightens, Cawthra Road's lanes converge with the freeway to form a collector-express system as it approaches the interchange with Eglinton Avenue, while the eastbound express-to-collector transfer also marks the start of another HOV lane. The portion of the highway between Hurontario Street and Eglinton Avenue is the busiest along the route, with approximately 180,000vehicles travelling it on an average day in 2016.

After crossing Matheson Boulevard, the freeway's central HOV lanes terminate and merge with the express lanes. The freeway then approaches a sprawling interchange, with the express lanes curving east and defaulting to Highway401's express lanes east of that junction, while the collector lanes (including its HOV lane) pass under several sets of flyovers and thereafter continues north as Highway 410 to Brampton. The freeway's collector lanes also have connecting ramps to both directions of Highway401's collector lanes.

History 

Though one of the first divided highways conceived for Ontario, Highway403 is one of the most recently completed freeways in the province; the multiple segments of the route did not become continuous until 2002. Planning for the route was underway by 1958, with the completion of the Freeman Bypass along the QEW providing a three-legged junction for the new freeway. Sections of Highway403 through Hamilton opened between December 1963 and September 1969. An isolated section known as the Brantford Bypass was opened in October 1966, and would remain unconnected to other freeways for over 20years. Plans for a third segment through Mississauga were contemplated throughout the 1960s, but were not finalized until late 1977, after which construction began. Portions opened at both ends in 1980 and 1981, while the central gap, crossing the Credit River, was completed in December 1982.

Construction to bridge the gaps in Highway403 between Ancaster and Woodstock was carried out over three major phases. The first phase was a short extension of the Brantford Bypass beginning in 1975. Later, work began to connect that extension with Highway401 near Woodstock, opening in 1988. The last phase, between Ancaster and Brantford, was opened in 1997.
The final discontinuity, between Burlington and Oakville, was signed as a concurrency with the QEW in 2002. Originally, this section was to have travelled along the corridor occupied by Highway407, until budget shortfalls in 1995 resulted in a change of plans.

Predecessors 

The corridor that connects London and Hamilton has always been considered important to Ontario. In late October 1793, Captain Smith and 100 Queen's Rangers returned from carving The Governor's Road (Dundas Street)  through the thick forests between Dundas and the present location of Paris. John Graves Simcoe was tasked with defending Upper Canada from the United States following the American Revolution and with opening the virgin territory to settlement. After establishing a "temporary" capital at York, Simcoe ordered an inland route constructed between Cootes Paradise at the tip of Lake Ontario and his proposed capital of London. By the spring of 1794, the road was extended as far as La Tranche, now the Thames River. Today, most of this route forms part of former Highway 2 and former Highway 5.

The paving of the divided four-lane Middle Road, with gentle curves, a grass median, and grade-separated interchanges, would set the stage for the freeway concept. It was the first intercity freeway in North America when it opened in June 1939.
Thomas McQuesten, the new minister of the Department of Highways and the man most responsible for the Middle Road, decided to apply the concept to sections of Highway2 plagued with congestion. A portion east of Woodstock was rebuilt in this fashion, but World War II would put an end to McQuesten's ambitions, at least temporarily.

Initial construction 

The end of the Korean War in 1953 heralded the resumption of freeway construction in Ontario; the advances in machinery more than made up for lost time.
The construction of Highway401 across the province took first priority. However, the opening of the section of Highway 401 from Highway4 near London to Highway2 east of Woodstock on May31, 1957 would complete part of the route required between London and Hamilton.
By 1958, planning on the Chedoke Expressway, or Controlled Access Highway403, was well underway,
though plans for a four-lane freeway between Woodstock and Hamilton existed as early as 1954.
The opening of the Freeman Bypass of the QEW in August 1958 provided a connection point for a new freeway,
and construction began the same day that the Burlington Bay James N. Allan Skyway opened: October31, 1958.
Work was already underway on the next section of the route that would extend it to Aberdeen Avenue.

Meanwhile, to the west, work had begun on a bypass of Brantford.
A portion of the Brantford Bypass was itself bypassed in 1997 when the final section of Highway403 was completed and is known as Garden Avenue.
However, the Brantford Bypass would remain an isolated section of Highway403 for over 20years.

In Hamilton, work was underway on an extension of the Chedoke Expressway to Mohawk Road, crossing the Niagara Escarpment. This tedious project, which required extensive rock blasting, was soon accompanied by construction from Mohawk Road to Highway2 near Ancaster. Both projects were completed together and originally scheduled to be opened with a ribbon-cutting ceremony on August22, 1969.
However, local residents complained the new section lacked any barriers preventing children from wandering onto the highway, postponing the ceremony until August27 as temporary snow fencing was erected. This proved inadequate, and protests grew more vocal over the following week. Several petitions were presented to Deputy Highway Minister H. Howden on August26, and the ceremonies were cancelled.
Over the following week, Minister of Highways George Gomme met with residents and reached a compromise whereby a 24-hour patrol was established to watch for children until a proper fence could be constructed. The route was opened on September3, without any ceremony.
This completed the Hamilton section of Highway403.

Mississauga 

Planning for the segment of Highway403 through Mississauga dates to the late 1950s when the Hamilton Expressway appeared on the Metropolitan Toronto's regional transportation plan. It was to be a continuation of the Richview Expressway, which was ultimately never built, continuing from Toronto to Hamilton. The plan featured the expressway's eastern terminus at the Highway401 and Highway427 interchange. As Toronto's anti-expressway movement gained momentum, provincial plans shifted the Hamilton Expressway to the west near Etobicoke Creek. In 1962, the right-of-way alongside the hydro corridor between Burlington and Etobicoke Creek was protected after traffic studies indicated the need for a future freeway.
On May25, 1965, the Department of Highways unveiled the Toronto Region Western Section Highway Planning Study. The plan designated Highway403 north from Burlington and then parallel with the QEW to Highway401 near Highway27.

By the time construction was actually underway, plans had been completely modified to connect the overburdened QEW at Oakville with Highway401 at the new Highway410 interchange.
This interchange was a better connection point for Highway403, but would also require the widening of Highway401 from six lanes to twelve. Plans were submitted and approved in December 1977 by Mississauga city council, and construction began.

The new freeway opened in sections during the early 1980s. The first section between Cawthra Road and Highway401 was opened August18, 1980.
This was followed by a short section from Highway 5 (Dundas Street) south to the QEW at Ford Drive, which opened in mid-1981, with a further extension to Erin Mills Parkway opening on November17th of that year.
The final section to be opened took the longest to complete, involving construction of two bridges over the Credit River valley; it opened on December2, 1982. The cost of the entire  Mississauga segment was $87 million.

Around the same period, the Ministry of Transportation began to study upgrading Highway401 to a collector–express system between Renforth Drive and Highway403, and along Highway403 between Highway401 and Highway10 (Hurontario Street).
This took place between late 1982 and the summer of 1985; the existing outermost ramps from Highway403 to Highway401 eastbound were re-designated to serve collector traffic, as a pair of flyover ramps were added inside the interchange to serve motorists in the express lanes.

The right-of-way originally intended for Highway403 between Cawthra Road and Etobicoke Creek was eventually used for a controlled-access arterial extension called Eastgate Parkway, which was planned beginning in 1982.
The extension was built between 1988 and 1994, incorporating a portion of Fieldgate Drive at the eastern end.
The first section, between Cawthra Road and Dixie Road, opened in early 1991.
This was followed several years later by the section from Dixie Road to Eglinton Avenue that opened in late 1994.

In 1990 construction was underway on the planned but not-yet-built parts of the Highway401-403-410 interchange, alongside the widening of Highway410 into a full freeway, and the further expansion of Highway 401's collector-express system. At the time traffic from both freeways was forced onto eastbound Highway401. Two semi-directional flyover ramps were built, for the Highway 401 eastbound to Highway 410 northbound movement, and the Highway 410 southbound to Highway 401 eastbound movement, the latter which replaced an existing loop ramp. The removal of that loop ramp, as well as completion of the new flyovers in the interchange, would free up space for connections between Highway 403 and Highway 410 whose construction started in December 1991.
The  link opened on November2, 1992 at a cost of $7.3 million.

Bridging the gaps 

In 1975, construction began on a westward extension of the Brantford Bypass, from Highway2 (Paris Road) to Rest Acres Road, which would become Highway24. This work consisted of the twin bridges over the Grand River and an interchange at Rest Acres Road. The Canadian National Railway underpass west of Highway2 was built by the railway.
By the beginning of 1978, this work was completed.
Work resumed west of Highway24 in early 1982 to connect with Highway401 near Woodstock to relieve the high traffic volumes along Highway2.
This included interchanges at Brant County Road25 and Highway53.
A section from Highway24 to County Road25 was opened in November 1984,
followed by the section west of there to Highway53 one year later.
Construction of the gap between Highway53 and Highway401 began in late 1985,
followed by the Highway401 overpass for the westbound lanes, which began in 1987.
Transportation minister Ed Fulton ceremoniously opened the new freeway connection on September26, 1988, completing the Woodstock to Brantford link.

Highway403 was briefly left with three discontinuous sections: Woodstock–Brantford, Ancaster–Burlington, and Oakville–Mississauga.  Between Brantford and Ancaster, traffic was defaulted onto Highway2, a four-lane road with numerous private driveways and at-grade intersections. On March24, 1987, Chris Ward, MPP for Wentworth North announced that construction of the missing link between Brantford and Ancaster would begin in 1989.
Construction began in mid-1990. It included interchanges at Garden Avenue, Highway52 and Highway2.
A continuous construction program was carried out over the next seven years, with the link opening on August15, 1997.
Highway2, which was the only parallel route before the completion of Highway403, was subsequently downloaded to regional jurisdiction.

Controversy 
Though some officials considered Highway403 to be a perfect example of a freeway construction process, it was not built without its share of controversy. In addition to the previously mentioned issues that occurred in 1969, portions of the freeway through Mississauga were built alongside established communities, leading to angry homeowners' associations pressuring the province for noise mitigation measures and compensation.

In the late 1980s and early 1990s, the Mississauga section of Highway403 was the site of more than two dozen fatal accidents over a five-year period, one of the highest rates in North America at the time, despite being up to modern road standards. This led Peel Regional Police and the media to nickname it the "Death Highway."
In particular, the stretch from Mavis Road to Erin Mills Parkway has been the site of numerous accidents. In this section, Highway403 features a downward slope as motorists head eastbound towards the Mavis Road interchange; drivers complain of having to slam on the brakes when traffic comes to a standstill, leading to rear-end collisions. There is also glare from the sun that causes vision problems throughout the day.

Recent construction 
The Hamilton-Brantford and Mississauga sections of Highway403 were eventually planned to be linked up via an east–west extension that would run parallel to the QEW, as the current north–south routing of Highway403 along the Mississauga-Oakville boundary to end at the QEW was intended to be temporary and eventually assumed by the proposed Highway407. The interchange between Highway403 and Highway407 near Ninth Line was partially completed, allowing Highway403 access to a temporary east–west connector to Trafalgar Road (Halton Regional Road3).
However, the Bob Rae government altered these plans in 1995 due to budgetary constraints.
It was also announced the Mississauga section of Highway403 would be renumbered as Highway410,
although this was not done. Instead, Highway403 was signed concurrently along the Queen Elizabeth Way in 2002, remedying the discontinuity.
On September 4, 1998, Highway407 opened between Highway401 and Highway403, and by the middle of 2001 access was added to the Burlington–Oakville segment of Highway407 previously intended to be part of Highway403.

In early 2001, high-mast lighting added to the unlighted Mississauga section between Highway407 and Eastgate Parkway. The lighting masts are placed between the westbound carriageway and hydro corridor, rather than in the median like most other provincial freeways. In 2003, the right shoulders between Erin Mills Parkway and Mavis Road were widened for GO Transit and Mississauga Transit to run express bus service.
These projects preceded the widening of Highway403 between Highway407 and Highway401/410, through which a high-occupancy vehicle (HOV) lane was added in each direction; the project started on September 29, 2003  and was completed and opened on December13, 2005.
The HOV lanes and the dividing Ontario Tall Wall concrete barrier were constructed using the existing right-of-way provided by the grass median. Metrolinx began construction of the Mississauga Transitway West between Winston Churchill Boulevard and Erin Mills Parkway in October 2013, including realignment of hydro towers and new bus-only lanes crossing the existing ramps on the north side of Highway403's interchange with Winston Churchill Boulevard, which was completed on December 31, 2016.

Land was reserved at the Highway401/403/410 junction for a loop ramp from Highway403 eastbound to Highway401 westbound, and a directional ramp for the opposite movement, however as a prerequisite Highway401 first had to be widened west of this interchange. The existing underpasses for the Highway403 to Highway410 link have sufficient right-of-way to accommodate the addition of a new HOV lane to the Highway403 eastbound collectors that would tie into the expanded Highway410, as well as the approach to the loop ramp to Highway401 westbound. Construction commenced on these ramps by 2017.
The construction was completed in November 2018, allowing for full access in all directions between both freeways.

Highway403 between Woodstock and Burlington was formally dedicated as the Alexander Graham Bell Parkway on April27, 2016.

Improvements were made to the bottlenecked Highway 403/QEW/Ford Drive interchange in Oakville. Since 2017, traffic using the existing loop ramp in the NE corner to access Highway 403/QEW was directed onto a new overpass instead of sharing the existing overpass with westbound Highway 403 traffic. The existing bridges carrying QEW traffic across Ford Drive and the eastbound ramp to Highway 403 were demolished and replaced by new wider structures which can accommodate future HOV lanes and high-mast lighting. At the present Highway 403 only connects to the QEW west of the interchange, but a new set of flyover ramps are being proposed from Highway 403 to the QEW east of that junction using the existing right-of-way which would allow for a direct freeway connection from Milton to south Mississauga.

The 2017 initial design of the Hurontario LRT line had it occupying the centre median of Hurontario Street including the existing bridge crossing Highway403. At the southern approach to the bridge, there would be a junction for an LRT branch to the Mississauga City Centre, and the junction would have crossed the southbound traffic lanes of Hurontario Street and a Highway403 exit ramp at grade. However studies showed that this initial LRT route would seriously impact vehicular traffic at the Highway403-Hurontario interchange. A revised 2021 route proposes that the LRT cross Highway403 on its own elevated guideway to the west of Hurontario Street overpass.

There are preliminary proposals for adding HOV lanes to Highway403 within Burlington, alongside a proposal to modify the Freeman Interchange.

Exit list

References

Citations

Bibliography

External links 

 Detailed route information for Highway 403
 Virtual Tour of Highway 403
 
 
 

03
Roads in Hamilton, Ontario
Roads in Mississauga
Transport in Brantford
Transport in Burlington, Ontario
Transport in Oakville, Ontario